Queen Nanny, Granny Nanny, or Nanny of the Maroons ONH (c. 1686 – c. 1733), was an 18th-century leader of the Jamaican Maroons. She led a community of formerly enslaved Africans called the Windward Maroons. In the early 18th century, under the leadership of Nanny, the Windward Maroons fought a guerrilla war over many years against British authorities in the Colony of Jamaica in what became known as the First Maroon War.

Much of what is known about her comes from oral history, as little textual evidence exists. According to Maroon legend, Queen Nanny was born in what is today Ghana of the Asante. According to the oral tradition and at least one documentary source, she was never enslaved. Although widely assumed that she arrived in Jamaica as a slave, how she arrived in Jamaica is not certain.

During the years of warfare, the British suffered significant losses in their encounters with the Windward Maroons of eastern Jamaica. Maroons attributed their success against the British to the successful use of supernatural powers by Nanny, but historians argue that the Maroon mastery of guerrilla warfare played a significant role in their success. Having failed to defeat them on the battle field, the British sued for peace, signing a treaty with them on 20 April 1740. The treaty stopped the hostilities, provided for state sanctioned freedom for the Maroons, and granted 500 acres of land to Nanny and her followers. The village built on the land grant still stands and today is called Moore Town. It is also known as the New Nanny Town. Modern members of the Moore Town celebrate 20 April 1740 as a holiday.

In 1975, the government of Jamaica declared Nanny as their only female national hero celebrating her success as a leader, military tactician and strategist. Her image is also on the Jamaican $500 note which is called a Nanny in Jamaican slang.

The origins of Nanny 
According to Maroon legend, Nanny was born into the Akan people about 1686 in what is now Ghana, West Africa. There are several versions of her early story. It is not clear from objective sources which are accurate.

In one story, she came as a free woman who may have even had her own slaves. In another, she came to Jamaica as a slave but then escaped, perhaps even jumping off of the ship while it was offshore.  However, the oral traditions about her arrival in Jamaica maintain that she was always free.

Another version of her life tells that she was of royal African blood and came to Jamaica as a free woman. She may have been married to a Maroon man named Adou, but had no known children who survived. 
Relatives of poet John Agard claim descent from Nanny.

The Jamaican Maroons 

The maroons are descendants of West Africans, mainly people from the Akan. They were known as Coromantie or Koromantee, and were considered ferocious fighters. A number of the enslaved originated from other regions of Africa, including Nigeria, the Congo and Madagascar. However, the origin of at least half of the enslaved African people in Jamaica during the early English colonisation of the island is uncertain.

After being brought to Jamaica in the course of the Transatlantic slave trade, many enslaved Africans fled from the oppressive conditions of plantations and formed their own communities of free black people in Jamaica in the rugged, hilly interior of the island. People who escaped from slavery joined these Maroon communities in the mountains of eastern Jamaica, or the Cockpit Country in the west of the island. Up to the 1650s under Spanish rule, enslaved Africans escaped and intermarried with the native islanders, the Taíno or Arawak, in their communities in the Blue Mountains (Jamaica), located in Portland Parish and Saint Thomas Parish, Jamaica, in the eastern end of the island.
The Maroons were escaped slaves. They ran away from their Spanish-owned plantations when the British took the Caribbean island of Jamaica from Spain in 1655.

Windward Maroons 

In 1655, following the Invasion of Jamaica, the English captured Jamaica from the Spaniards, but many Spanish slaves became free under Spanish Maroon leaders such as Juan de Bolas and Juan de Serras. The Spanish left, freeing their slaves in the process, and they joined the Windward Maroon communities. These formerly enslaved people, with their ranks enhanced with escaped and liberated slaves, became the core of the Windward Maroons. They staged a prolonged fight against English subjugation and enslavement. Later in the 17th century, more slaves escaped joining the two main bands of Windward and Leeward Maroons. By the early 18th century, these Maroon towns were headed respectively by Nanny, who shared the leadership of the eastern Maroons with Quao, and Captain Cudjoe and Accompong in the west. The Windward Maroons fought the British on the east side of the island from their villages in the Blue Mountains of Portland.

The community raised animals, hunted, and grew crops. Maroons at Nanny Town and similar communities survived by sending traders to the nearby market towns to exchange food for weapons and cloth. It was organized very much like a typical Asante society in Africa. From 1655 until they signed peace treaties in 1739 and 1740, these Maroons led most of the slave rebellions in Jamaica, helping to free slaves from the plantations. They raided and then damaged lands and buildings held by plantation owners.

The Maroons were also known for raiding plantations for weapons and food, burning the plantations, and leading freed slaves to join their mountain communities. Nanny was highly successful at organizing plans to free slaves. During a period of 30 years, she was credited with freeing more than 1000 slaves, and helping them to resettle in the Maroon community.

The First Maroon War 

By 1720, Nanny and Quao, sometimes called her brother, settled and controlled an area in the Blue Mountains. It was later given the name Nanny Town, and it had a strategic location overlooking Stony River via a 900-foot (270 m) ridge, making a surprise attack by the British very difficult.

Nanny became a folk hero among the Maroons and the slaves. While the British captured Nanny Town on more than one occasion, they were unable to hold on to it, in the wake of numerous guerrilla attacks from the Maroons. The Maroons waged a successful war against the British colonial forces over the course of a decade.

When Nanny Town was abandoned, the Windward Maroons under the command of Nanny moved to New Nanny  Town. Between 1728 and 1734, during the First Maroon War, Nanny Town and other Maroon settlements were frequently attacked by British colonial forces. They wanted to stop the raids and believed that the Maroons prevented settlement of the interior. According to some accounts, in 1733 many Maroons of Nanny Town travelled across the island to unite with the Leeward Maroons. In 1734, a Captain Stoddart attacked the remnants of Nanny Town, "situated on one of the highest mountains in the island", via "the only path" available: "He found it steep, rocky, and difficult, and not wide enough to admit the passage of two persons abreast."

In addition to the use of the ravine, resembling what Jamaicans call a "cockpit", the Maroons also used decoys to trick the British into ambushes. A few Maroons would run out into view of the British and then run in the direction of fellow Maroons who were hidden and would attack. After falling into these ambushes several times, the British retaliated. According to planter Bryan Edwards, who wrote his narrative half a century later, Captain Stoddart "found the huts in which the negroes were asleep", and "fired upon them so briskly, that many were slain in their habitations". However, recent evidence shows that the number of Windward Maroons killed by Stoddart in his attack on Nanny Town was in single digits.

Military tactics 
The Windward Maroons' success against a much superior and better armed enemy was a testament to the great skill their leader, Nanny, possessed. One of their advantages over the British was their long-range communications capability. They pioneered the use of a cow horn called an abeng. This horn with a hole drilled in one end was used for long range communications. Its signals allowed Maroon lookouts to communicate over great distances, and they were not understood by the British who had no similar communications capability.

Nanny's troops were masters of camouflage. The soldiers were so proficient at disguising their location that the British would circulate tales of trees in the forest becoming alive and cutting one's head off. Besides the physical aspects of camouflage the Maroons became experts in slowing their breathing so as not to reveal their presence to someone in their vicinity. The maroons also developed ways of creating stealthy fires that were not readily visible.

The Windward Maroons were innovators in guerrilla warfare. They used surprise, the knowledge of the terrain, and cleverly chosen positions in their fight against the British. Their village was located in rugged territory with only one way in. That one way in was a narrow path that was only wide enough for one person. Soldiers trying to attack arrayed in a single file were easily ambushed. To heighten the enemy's fear, Nanny's forces never killed all of the attacking forces. She would always allow a remnant to live to return to base to relay the story and horror of the encounter.

Treaty 
When the British signed a treaty with Cudjoe in 1739, this success allowed them to offer a less favorable treaty to the Windward Maroons. Representatives of the British governor in Jamaica signed a treaty with the Windward Maroons in 1740, between the colonial authorities and Quao, who later became one of the leaders of Crawford's Town. This treaty between the colonial authorities and Quao's Maroons made no mention of how much land would be allocated to Crawford's Town. As a result, a number of disputes occurred between planters and the Maroons of Crawford's Town, and later the succeeding towns of Charles Town and Scott's Hall. In response, the Assembly of Jamaica often tried to resolve the land disputes in favour of the Maroons in order to keep the peace.

In addition, later that year, there was a separate land grant signed with Nanny and the Maroons of Nanny Town, which granted "Nanny and the people now residing with her and their heirs ... a certain parcel of Land containing five hundred acres in the parish of Portland ...". This land patent consisted of 500 acres (2.4 km2) of land granted by the government to the Maroons of New Nanny Town under a separate 1740 document ending the First Maroon War. The rebuilt Nanny Town, later called Moore Town was built on that location. In 1781, the Assembly agreed to purchase another additional 500 acres from neighbouring planter Charles Douglas to increase Moore Town's communal land to 1,000 acres.

The New Nanny Town Maroons, like those of Cudjoe and Quao, agreed not to harbour new runaway slaves, but to help catch them for bounties. The Maroons were also expected to fight for the British in the case of an attack from the French or Spanish. In signing treaties with the Maroons, the British not only made a truce with a troublesome foe but also enlisted that foe in capturing runaway slaves. The colonial authorities initially recognised two Maroon towns: Crawford's Town and Cudjoe's Town, later to be renamed Trelawny Town. Eventually, there were five Maroon towns in the 18th century – Accompong Town, Trelawny Town, Charles Town, Scott's Hall, and Nanny Town (later Moore Town) – living under their own chiefs with a British supervisor in each town. In exchange, they agreed not to harbour new runaway slaves, but to help catch them for bounties.

Moore Town and Tacky's War 

New Nanny Town was renamed Moore Town, possibly in 1760 after the governor Sir Henry Moore, 1st Baronet, during Tacky's War, which the Maroons helped to suppress. The first official reference to Moore Town in the colonial records was in 1760.

By 1760, New Nanny Town, now known as Moore Town, was under the command of a white superintendent named Charles Swigle, and the Maroon leaders of that town, Clash and Sambo, reported to Swigle, when the superintendent commanded their forces against slave rebels in Tacky's War. It is possible that Nanny had already died by this time.

A Spiritual Woman 

Many in her community attributed Nanny's leadership skills to her Obeah powers. Obeah is an African-derived religion that is still practised in Suriname, Jamaica, Trinidad and Tobago, Guyana, Barbados, Belize and other Caribbean countries. It is associated with both good and bad magic, charms, luck, and with mysticism in general. In some Caribbean nations, aspects of Obeah have survived through synthesis with Christian symbolism and practice introduced by European colonials and slave owners.

According to Maroon oral history, Nanny's success in defending her people against the colonial forces was often attributed to her mysterious supernatural powers. According to legend, Nanny had magical powers, and could catch bullets and then redirect them back at the people who shot at her.

Another Maroon legend claims that if any straight haired, white man, goes to the original Nanny Town, he is immediately struck dead.

Death 

In the Journal of the Assembly of Jamaica, 29–30 March 1733, is a citation for "resolution, bravery and fidelity" awarded to "loyal slaves ... under the command of Captain Sambo", namely William Cuffee, who was rewarded for having fought the Maroons in the First Maroon War and who is called "a very good party Negro, having killed Nanny, the rebels old obeah woman". These hired soldiers were known as "Black Shots".

However, it is unlikely that Cuffee killed the Nanny who ran Nanny Town, since there is evidence Moore Town was granted to her people under her leadership in 1740.

Some claim that Queen Nanny lived to be an old woman, dying of natural causes in the 1760s. The exact date of her death remains a mystery. Part of the confusion is that "Nanny" is an honorific title, and many high-ranking women were called that in Maroon Town. However, the Maroons are adamant that there was only one "Queen Nanny."

According to Maroon oral history, Nanny's remains are buried at "Bump Grave" in Moore Town.

Accolades 
Nanny is celebrated in Jamaica and abroad:

 The government of Jamaica declared Queen Nanny a National Hero in 1975. Colonel C.L.G. Harris of Moore Town, then a Senator in Jamaica's upper house, was the driving force behind the move to recognise Nanny as a National Heroine. 
 Her portrait is featured on the $500 Jamaican dollar bill, which is colloquially referred to as a "Nanny".
 Nanny is celebrated every October on Jamaican National Heroes Day. 
 Nanny's Monument is located in Moore Town, Portland, Jamaica.
 Nannyville Gardens, a residential community located in Kingston, Jamaica, was founded in 1977 and named after her.
 The Gilder Lehrman Center for the Study of Slavery, Resistance and Abolition at Yale University in the United States uses Nanny's portrait in its logo. The Center sponsors research and conferences on slavery in the Americas.
 A ship in the Jamaica Defence Force Coast Guard is named after Nanny. HMJS Nanny of the Maroons.

References

Bibliography

External links
 Deborah Gabriel: "Jamaica’s True Queen: Nanny of the Maroons" at jamaica.com
National Heroes - short biography on a government website

Jamaican Maroon leaders
Jamaican people of Ghanaian descent
Jamaican rebel slaves
National Heroes of Jamaica
Women in war in the Caribbean
Women in 18th-century warfare
18th-century Jamaican people
Female revolutionaries